The Ferdinand C. Hartwig House is a historic house located at 908 Country Lane in Watertown, Wisconsin. It was added to the National Register of Historic Places on June 17, 1982.

History 
The house was built by Prussian immigrant Ferdinand Hartwig. It was later bought by Kirby and Judith Brant. Current owners Jerold & Jill LaPinske 1998 to present.

References 

Sited on a rise, the Hartwig house is a rectangular two-story cream brick Italianate style building with an attached ell and entrance porch. The foundation is made of fieldstone which is substantially exposed. The dwelling is further characterized by a cupola, overhanging eaves, flat window lintels, peaked moulded lintels, a hip roofed dormer and eyebrow windows. The entrance features a sidelighted door with an overlight. This door is sheltered by a flat roofed portico, which is in turn supported by squared columns on paneled bases. Fronting a recessed wing extension is another porch, whose elements include a hipped roof, columns and a porch railing. The original windows have been replaced. The residence, which is in excellent condition, has had an addition built on an unspecified date.

Until the 1950s, the house was surrounded by the barn and other farm outbuildings. The original farm land has been subdivided into lots and partially developed.

Architectural/Engineering Significance:

The Ferdinand Hartwig house is significant under Criterion C as one of the best vernacular examples of the Italianate influence in Watertown. Topped by a twenty-light cupola, the Hartwig house features overhanging eaves, articulated window heads and the cubic shape characteristic of the simple Italianate style found in vernacular architecture. However, the Hartwig house does not exhibit as much Italianate architectural character as other substantial examples in the city. More elaborate examples of the style are located at 802 North Fourth, 700 Clyman, and 802 Clyman.

Historical Background:

This house was built by Ferdinand Hartwig in 1864 at what was then the center of his large farm at the northwest edge of Watertown (now part of the city limits). He lived in this house until 1921. Hartwig, a German immigrant, came to the Watertown area in the 1850s. He acquired his farm in 1861 and then built this fine house. Hartwig grew a large amount of grain crops on the farm, but also raised sheep and cattle. By 1890, when dairying was becoming the important component of Wisconsin's agriculture that it is today, Hartwig began concentrating on breeding Holstein-Friesian dairy cattle. These cattle eventually became the mainstay breed of the modern dairy industry in the state. Hartwig's cattle breeding helped establish many dairy herds around Watertown. (See Bib. Ref. C).

Historical Significance:

This house was listed in the National Register of Historic Places for both architecture and local history because of Hartwig's importance in breeding Holstein cattle for the dairy farms of the area. Since Holsteins became the most important dairy cattle in the state, and since Hartwig made significant strides in improving and promoting the breed in the Watertown area, and since this house is the only remaining resource associated with him, it is significant and was listed on the National Register.
Bibliographic References:A. Evelyn Ruddick Rose, Our Heritage of Homes, (Watertown Historical Society, 1980), p. 11-12. B. Date of construction source: National Register Nomination Form, Ferdinand Hartwig House, Files, Preservation Office, State Historical Society of Wisconsin. C. National Register of Historic Places Nomination Form, the Ferdinand Hartwig House, 1981, on file at the State Historic Preservation Office, State Historical Society of Wisconsin, Madison, Wisconsin.

Houses in Dodge County, Wisconsin
Houses completed in 1864
Houses on the National Register of Historic Places in Wisconsin
Italianate architecture in Wisconsin
National Register of Historic Places in Dodge County, Wisconsin